Ken Brown or Kenny Brown may refer to:

Ken Brown (filmmaker) (born 1944), American filmmaker, photographer, cartoonist, and designer
Ken Brown (footballer) (born 1934), England and West Ham United football player, later Norwich City manager
Ken Brown (golfer) (born 1957), Scottish golfer and BBC golf broadcaster
Ken Brown (ice hockey) (born 1948), Canadian ice hockey player
Ken Brown (musician) (1940–2010), English guitarist for The Quarrymen
Ken Brown (linebacker) (born 1971), American football player
Ken Brown (wide receiver) (born 1965), American football player
Ken Brown (running back) (1945–2001), American football running back
Ken Brown (offensive lineman) (born 1954), American football offensive lineman
Ken Brown (basketball) (born 1989), American basketball player
Bundy K. Brown, also known as Ken Brown, American multi-instrumentalist and founding member of Tortoise
Kenny Brown (footballer) (born 1967), English former professional footballer
Kenny Brown (guitarist) (born 1953), American blues guitarist
Kenny Browne (born 1986), Irish football defender most prominently associated with Waterford F.C.

See also
Kenneth Brown (disambiguation)